James Jianzhang Liang (born December 1969) is a Chinese businessman, and the executive chairman, former CEO, and co-founder of Trip.com Group (formerly Ctrip), a provider of travel services including accommodation reservation, transportation ticketing, packaged tours, and corporate travel management. Liang is a research professor of Applied Economics at Peking University's Guanghua School of Management. and is also a scholar of demographics and social studies. Liang has been vocal on China's population policies in recent years and in generating public interest in issues such as education and urban planning.

Education
Liang entered special class for gifted youths at Fudan University in Shanghai in 1985 and studied for one year before leaving for attending the Georgia Institute of Technology in the United States.

He received a master of arts in computer science from the Georgia Institute of Technology in 1989 and a doctor of philosophy in economics from Stanford University in 2011.

Career
From 1991 to 1999, Liang worked for Oracle Corporation in the US and China, in technical and managerial roles, rising to head of Oracle China's ERP consulting division.

Liang co-founded Ctrip in 1999, with Neil Shen, Min Fan, and Ji Qi. He  was the CEO from 2000 to January 2006, and from March 2013 to November 2016, and chairman since August 2003. In November 2016, Jane Jie Sun succeeded him as CEO, with Liang remaining as executive chairman.

Liang is a board member of BTG Hotels (Group) Co. Ltd (SHA: 600258), Tongcheng-Elong (HK: 0780), and MakeMyTrip (NASDAQ: MMYT).

Academia and advocacy 
Liang is a scholar of demographics, entrepreneurship, and innovation research. In recent years, he has advocated for the restructuring of China's population and family planning policies, drawing public attention to key issues such as education, ageing, and urban planning.

He is a co-author of the book Too Many People in China?, which analyzes the impact of the one-child policy and the adverse effects of demographic changes on China's economy. He is the author of multiple other publications, including The Rise of the Network Society, The Chinese Dream Calls for the Chinese Child, and his 2018 book, The Demographics of Innovation. Liang published a demographics-focused novel in 2020, After Immortality, based on a dystopian society.

In 2021, Liang taught a lecture series, 15 Lectures on Demographic Economics, where he shared his research findings and policy suggestions. The lecture series was released under the title Age of Ultra-Low Fertility: Population Economics as a podcast and article series, where Liang called on all sectors of society to recognize the impact the low fertility rate, ageing population and other realities will continue to have on Chinese society after the liberalization of the three-child policy, whilst advocating for the government to actively encourage raising fertility.

Publications
After Immortality
The Demographics of Innovation: Why Demographics is a Key to the Innovation Race'
Too Many People in China?
The Rise of the Network Society'

References

1969 births
Ctrip people
Living people
Chinese company founders
Stanford University alumni
Economists from Shanghai
Georgia Tech alumni
Fudan University alumni
Oracle employees
20th-century Chinese businesspeople
21st-century Chinese businesspeople
Businesspeople from Shanghai